Encore is the sixth studio album by Taiwanese Mandopop girl group S.H.E. It was released on 12 November 2004 by HIM International Music. This is the first album that S.H.E released in the autumn, on account of Selina's graduation from university. A second Encore (DVD Plus Edition) was also released.

"候鳥" (Migratory Bird) was composed by Jay Chou and features Chinese music elements. It was the Mandarin theme song of Japanese film, Quill. This song was written on behalf of Ella's previous relationship which had ended on a bad note. Jay Chou composed the song, and it was said that Ella cried when she read the lyrics. After "我愛你" (I Love You) was produced, Sweetbox re-sang it as "More than Love".

Reception
The track, "候鳥" (Migratory Bird) won one of the Top 10 Songs of the Year at the 2005 HITO Radio Music Awards presented by Taiwanese radio station Hit FM. It was also nominated for Top 10 Gold Songs at the Hong Kong TVB8 Awards, presented by television station TVB8, in 2005.

The album was awarded one of the Top 10 Selling Mandarin Albums of the Year at the 2005 IFPI Hong Kong Album Sales Awards, presented by the Hong Kong branch of IFPI.

Track listing
The tracks was retitled to English for the iTunes release.
 "候鳥" Hou Niao (Migratory Bird) - 4:44
 "痛快" Tong Kuai (Raciness [iTunes UK+Australia] / Piquancy [iTunes US]) - 3:19
 "別說對不起" Bie Shuo Dui Bu Qi (Don't Say Sorry) - 3:52 (Cover of Everytime by Britney Spears) 
 "我愛你" Wo Ai Ni (I Love You) - 3:55 (Cover of More Than Love by Sweetbox)
 "鬥牛士之歌" Dou Niu Shi Zhi Ge (Matador's Song) - 3:50 
 "對號入座" Dui Hao Ru Zuo (Take Seat By Number) - 4:04 (Cover of Japanese Boy by Aneka) 
 "金鐘罩鐵布衫" Jin Zhong Zhao Tie Bu Shan (Golden Shield, Iron Cloth) - 4:05
 "大女人主義" Da Nu Ren Zhu Yi (Female Chauvinism) - 3:59
 "不在場" Bu Zai Chang (Absent) -  4:32
 "保持微笑" Bao Chi Wei Xiao (Keep Smiling) - 4:21

Music videos
"我愛你" (I Love You)  - The music video was filmed in Shanghai, PRC. There are two versions of the video: a 3-minute TV version, and a 12-minute full version. The 12-minute version features two elderly people who reflect upon their love life back when they were still young. In 1940s Shanghai, the girl tells her lover that her family is moving to Taiwan, likely due to the Chinese Civil War. She gives the boy a box containing her love inside, and leaves in tears. In 1989, the girl, now a grandmother of at least two children, receives a letter from the boy, now a single elderly man. Unlike the grandmother, who seems to enjoy life with her husband, children and grandchildren, the old man has been waiting for the past few decades for his lover to come back to Shanghai.

Review
This album was released on the same day as Encore by Eminem.

Chart positions

Top positions

Weeks on chart

References

External links
  S.H.E discography@HIM International Music

2004 albums
S.H.E albums
HIM International Music albums